Fiorino is a village in Tuscany, central Italy, administratively a frazione of the comune of Montescudaio, province of Pisa. At the time of the 2001 census its population was 299.

Fiorino is about 60 km from Pisa and 9 km from Montescudaio.

References 

Frazioni of the Province of Pisa